The Commemorative Cross to the Romanian Heroes of the First World War, also called the Heroes' Cross on Mount Cairaman (Crucea Eroilor de pe Muntele Caraiman) is a monument built between 1926 and 1928 on Caraiman Peak at an altitude of 2,291 m located in Romania, in the Bucegi Mountains of the Southern Carpathians. The name of the monument is "The Heroes' Cross", but it is popularly known as the "Cross on Caraiman".

Location and size
The monument is the tallest summit cross in the world situated at such an altitude, as recognized in 2014 by Guinness World Records. Inside the pedestal there is a room that originally housed the electric generator that powered the 120 light bulbs of 500 W each located on the perimeter of the cross.

Monument construction
The Heroes' Cross was built between 1926 and 1928 in the memory of the railway heroes who died on duty in World War I fighting against the armies of the Central Powers. The cross was erected at the initiative of Marie of Edinburgh and King Ferdinand of Romania in order to be seen from a large distance as possible. The overall project was developed by Romanian architects Georges Cristinel and Constantin Procopiu. The construction of the monument began in 1926 and was completed in August 1928. Queen Marie had closely followed the implementation of her instructions until the completion of the project. Inauguration and consecration of the monument took place on September 14, 1928 on the Holy Cross Day. The monument was made of metal sleepers joined by riveting in a network pattern. The actual construction was done by the Heroes' Cult Society that mobilized a large number of young people. Tools, wood, metal parts, the remaining components and all the necessary materials were transported by train to the Buşteni railway station. From here some metal beams and other building materials were transported by oxen on the route Buşteni - Sinaia - Păduchiosul Peak - Dichiu Peak - Bucegi Plateau - Caraiman Peak and the remaining materials were transported by the funicular owned by the Buşteni Paper Mill. The funicular transported different parts along the Jepilor Valley all the way to Schiel Canton, where they were taken on narrow trails with horses and donkeys to the top of the Caraiman Peak.

Illumination
At first lighting of the monument was made with the help of an electricity generator (located in the concrete pedestal) and 120 bulbs of 500 W each. Until the communist regime in 1948, the cross was lit on the night of the Dormition of the Theotokos (August 15) but also on the Ascension day when the Hero Remembrance Day was celebrated as well.

The monument is currently administrated by the Buşteni City Council. Nowadays, at night, the Cross on Caraiman is illuminated with 300 light bulbs of 500 W each and can be seen from dozens of miles away, on the Prahova Valley. There is a new project which aims to cover the cross with a fluorescent dye and on top of the cross to be a projected laser spot.

Image gallery

Notes

See also
 Tourism in Romania
 Seven Wonders of Romania
Romania during World War I

References
  Răzvan Bunea, Marius Nica, Praise to the Lord at over 2200 meters, Evenimentul Zilei, September 4, 2007, retrieved online at September 11, 2007.

1928 establishments in Romania
Monuments and memorials in Romania
Buildings and structures in Prahova County
Tourist attractions in Prahova County
Monumental crosses
Greater Romania